The For-Site Foundation, established in 2003, is a nonprofit organization dedicated to creating collaborative art about place. Based in both San Francisco and Nevada City, California, For-Site collaborates with artists and national parks to create site-specific works of all media. Its work includes site-specific projects done at usually inaccessible sites in the bay area, including Alcatraz and the Presidio, and a residency program and educational partnerships that both take place on their 50-acre site in Nevada City. Gallerist Cheryl Haines founded For-Site in 2003 and has played an integral role in curating and collaborating with artists since.

Selected works

@Large: Ai Weiwei on Alcatraz 

For-Site Foundation's installation “@Large: Ai Weiwei on Alcatraz,” was an "unprecedented exhibition"  that ran within Alcatraz prison from September 27, 2014, to April 26, 2015.  Ai Weiwei, restricted from leaving China since 2011, was unable to be onsite for installation and thus the project was a collaboration between him and Haines as curator.  Haines, speaking about the show, said “one of the basic themes of this exhibition is 'what is freedom?'”  The installation had seven parts, With Wind, Trace, Refraction, Stay Tuned, Illumination, Blossom, and Yours Truly. “With Wind” is a huge traditional Chinese dragon kite, weaving its way in and out of pillars in one of Alcatraz's frames of a hall, its body holding names of imprisoned and exiled activists. Haines spoke about the kite in “With Wind,” “It will be flying, it will be free, but it will also be restricted in the building, so it’s this really interesting conversation between control and freedom.”   The installation created a point of access to many of the prison's spaces that visitors are not usually able to enter, reinforcing ideas of control, detainment, and freedom through a collaboration with Alcatraz as a site. The project went on to be featured in the feature documentary, "Ai Weiwei: Yours Truly" which was produced by the FOR-SITE Foundation and debuted as a World Premiere  in 2019 at the San Francisco International Film Festival.

International Orange 

“For-Site’s goal is to have the art really underscore the history of any place we do an installation. The fort has been open on the weekend for many years, but most people have no idea what’s inside. There had never been a major contemporary art show here until now,” For-Site collaborator, Marnie Berk De Guzman, said in an interview about International Orange. The diverse range of work featured in it celebrated the 75th anniversary of the Golden Gate Bridge with the work of fifteen artists inside Fort Point, the civil war-era open-air structure at the base of the golden gate on the San Francisco side.

“I really wanted to showcase artists whose ideologies are quite diverse, whose sense of materiality is distinctive and different from one another. We also needed to be sure each artist could address a site that is so rich historically but also challenging, with restrictions around issues of historical preservation and harshness of climate. The resulting exhibition contains works in a wide variety of media including photography, videography, sound, and both found and fabricated objects,” Sheryl Haines said about the exhibition.

Presidio Habitats 

“The first site-based art exhibition in a U.S. National Park, Presidio Habitats began in mid-2009, when more than two dozen artists, designers and architects were asked to design habitat sculptures for selected “animal clients” of the Presidio. From 25 proposals, eleven were selected to be created and installed along Presidio trails and walkways.”

Mark Dion's "Marvelous Museum" at OMCA 

http://museumca.org/exhibit/marvelous-museum-project-mark-dion

Richard Long's "The Path is the Place is the Line" at SFMOMA 

https://www.sfmoma.org/press/release/sfmoma-presents-exhibition-in-varied-media-richar/

Cornelia Parker 
Cornelia Parker was the first artist to complete the FOR-SITE Foundation residency established in 2004. There, she developed a sequel to Mass (Colder Darker Matter) (1997)  The work was presented at Yerba Buena Center for the Arts's Risk and Response series during its 2005/2006 season.

References

External links 
http://www.for-site.org/about2/FOR-SITE%20Foundation-International%20Orange.pdf
 http://www.for-site.org/
 http://www.parksconservancy.org/visit/art/current-exhibits/biography-cheryl-haines.html?referrer=https://www.google.com/
 http://museumca.org/exhibit/marvelous-museum-project-mark-dion
 http://artdaily.com/news/15578/Cornelia-Parker-at-Yerba-Buena-Center#.VlS-TmSrSuU
 https://www.sfmoma.org/press/release/sfmoma-presents-exhibition-in-varied-media-richar/
 http://ww2.kqed.org/arts/2014/09/27/art-behind-bars-on-alcatraz-ai-weiwei-celebrates-the-silenced/

Non-profit organizations based in California